= Business Succession (Japan) =

Jigyōshōkei (事業承継, business succession) refers to the transfer of all business-related matters, such as management rights, corporate philosophy, assets, and liabilities, to the successor of the company. Common successors typically fall into the following three categories.

- Succession by relatives: 55.4%
- Succession by executives or employees (outside the family): 19.1%
- Succession by external parties through such processes as mergers and acquisitions (M&A): 16.5%

The term business succession has been used since the 2010s by the Small and Medium Enterprise Agency of the Ministry of Economy, Trade and Industry, Japan, originating from small and medium business owners’ concerns about continuation of their businesses after they leave.

== The process of business succession ==
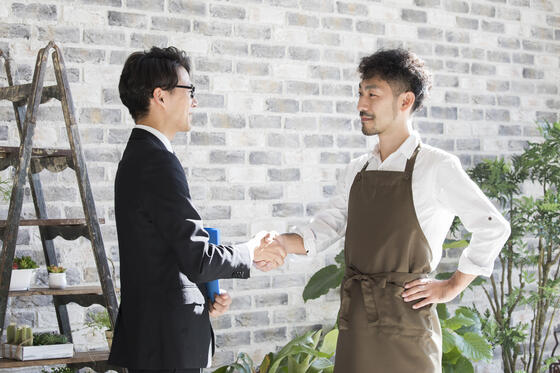

Business succession is generally conducted through the following steps.

- Recognition of the necessity of preparations for business succession.
- Recognition of the current business situation and challenges and making them transparent.
- In the case of external succession, search for a compatible successor from external sources and execution of M&A.
- In the case of family or internal succession, enhancement of management towards the transition and formulation of succession plans.
- Execution of business succession.
- Post-succession of business (growth, development).

The overall duration of business successions ranges from less than 1 year (55.1%), 1 to 2 years (27.9%), 3 to 4 years (8.5%), and 5 years and above (8.5%). In many cases, companies need a medium-to-long-term period from the preparation to the execution of the succession.

== Circumstances of business succession ==
According to the 2019 Small and Medium Enterprises White Paper, it is projected that owners of small and medium businesses over the average retirement age of 70 will soon surpass 2.45 million. Approximately half of them, about 1.27 million, are predicted to have no successors, potentially leading to a significant wave of business closures, including profitable businesses. As a result, it is estimated that over the ten years up to 2025, approximately 6.5 million jobs may be lost, and there is also the potential for a loss of around 220 billion USD in GDP.

Furthermore, an investigation conducted in 2016 by the Japan Finance Corporation Research Institute reported that about half of the business owners who were 60 or older said they were planning to close down their businesses. The most common response was that they had originally planned to close their businesses during their generation (38%), followed by the lack of a successor in the family (29%) and a perceived absence of prospects for the business (28%). However, 30% of these companies responded that they were performing better than their competitors, and 40% said that they could at least maintain the status quo regarding the outlook for the next ten years, indicating a tendency for companies to choose to close their businesses despite their favorable performance.

== Changes in the circumstances of business succession ==
Due to the increasing popularity of external business succession, there has been a growing trend where business successions are facilitated through intermediary companies such as the Business Succession Support Center (a public institution), as well as Japan M&A Center and Strike M&A Capital Partners, which are major private-sector firms. Meanwhile, the emergence of M&A matchmaking services, such as xTRANBI and BATONZ, which connect transferors with transferees online, is accelerating the development of an environment that handles a wide range of businesses, from small-scale companies to large corporations. Financial institutions such as banks, securities companies, and insurance companies have begun to enter the M&A intermediary business, both on offline and online platforms.

In 2009, the Business Succession Tax System was introduced to encourage small and medium-sized enterprises to pass on their businesses by permitting the deferring payment of gift and inheritance taxes on certain assets. Furthermore, a special system was introduced in 2018, in which if the successor serves as the CEO for five years immediately after the tax return due date, the inheritance tax can effectively be waived.

On March 31, 2020, the Small and Medium-sized M&A Guidelines were released by the steering committee led by the Small and Medium Enterprise Agency of the Ministry of Economy, Trade and Industry.
